Amphorothecium is a genus of fungi belonging to the family Myeloconidiaceae.

The genus was first described by  Patrick McCarthy, Gintaras Kantvilas & Jack Elix in 2001. There are no synonyms.

References

External links
ANBG: Amphorothecium occultum

Lecanoromycetes
Lichen genera
Taxa named by John Alan Elix
Taxa named by Gintaras Kantvilas
Lecanoromycetes genera
Ascomycota enigmatic taxa